Pavla Poznarová (born 26 September 1986) is a Czech handballer player for Sokol Poruba and the Czech national team.

References

1986 births
Living people
Czech female handball players
Sportspeople from Zlín
21st-century Czech women